Bias: A CBS Insider Exposes How the Media Distort the News is a non-fiction book by Bernard Goldberg, a 28-year veteran CBS news reporter and producer, giving detailed examples of liberal bias in television news reporting. It was published in 2001 by Regnery Publishing and reached number 1 on The New York Times Best Seller list in the non-fiction category.

See also 
 100 People Who Are Screwing Up America.

References

2001 non-fiction books
Books about media bias
Books critical of modern liberalism in the United States